, originally titled The Stranger in Alda, is a dungeon crawler role-playing video game developed by Experience, developer of Demon Gaze, for Microsoft Windows, Xbox 360, PlayStation Vita and Xbox One. The Japanese Xbox 360 and Vita versions have different subtitles: the Xbox 360 and Windows version is subtitled , whilst the Vita version is subtitled . The Xbox 360 version was released in Japan on June 5, 2014, and the PC and PS Vita versions followed in August 2014 and January 2015. The game was released internationally in 2016. An updated version of the game titled  was released for PlayStation Vita on July 21, 2016, in Japan and internationally on February 28, 2017.

Gameplay

Stranger of Sword City is a dungeon crawler style role-playing video game. Players progress through the game by navigating through dungeons laden with hazardous booby traps.

Plot

Development and release
Stranger of Sword City was originally announced in June 2012 with a 2013 release date. In April 2013, director Motoya Ataka announced that the game was "in the middle stage of development", with the music " about 80% complete." However, it was announced in September 2013 that due to delays, the game has been postponed, and will instead release in early 2014. In September 2013, Experience asked in for fans to submit concepts for boss characters, including "boss monsters for the end of the story, a top class boss for the middle of the game, a boss that has a unique fighting space like underwater or outer space, a flying or floating boss, a monster with scales, and "god" tiers for regular enemies." A teaser trailer was announced on February 7, 2014. It was also announced that the game, which was originally only planned for release on the PC and Xbox 360 platforms, would also be available for the PlayStation Vita. A new version of the game with a new graphical style, was released in March 2016 for the Xbox One.

Reception

Stranger of Sword City has an average score of 71 on Metacritic based on a total of 24 reviews. For the Xbox One version, the game has an average score of 70 based on a total of 12 reviews.

Four Famitsu reviewers gave the Xbox 360 version of Stranger of Sword City 8, 9, 8 and 7 out of 10, for a total of 32/40.

References

External links
 
 

2014 video games
First-person party-based dungeon crawler video games
Fantasy video games
Nintendo Switch games
PlayStation Vita games
Role-playing video games
Xbox 360 games
Xbox One games
Video games developed in Japan
Video games featuring female protagonists
Video game remakes
Windows games